George Clifton James (May 29, 1920 – April 15, 2017) was an American actor known for roles as a prison floorwalker in Cool Hand Luke (1967), Sheriff J.W. Pepper alongside Roger Moore in the James Bond films Live and Let Die (1973) and The Man with the Golden Gun (1974), the sheriff in Silver Streak (1976), a Texas tycoon in The Bad News Bears in Breaking Training (1977), and the owner of the scandalous 1919 Chicago White Sox baseball team in Eight Men Out (1988).

Early life
James was born in Spokane, Washington, the son of Grace (née Dean), a teacher, and Harry James, a journalist. He grew up in Oregon in the Gladstone area of Clackamas County.

James was a decorated World War II United States Army veteran. He served as an infantry platoon sergeant with Co. "A" 163rd Infantry, 41st Division. He served forty-two months in the South Pacific from January 1942 until August 1945. His decorations include the Silver Star, Bronze Star, and two Purple Hearts.

Career
James became well known for playing the comic-relief role of Louisiana Sheriff J.W. Pepper in the James Bond films Live and Let Die (1973) and The Man With The Golden Gun (1974). He played very similar characters in both Silver Streak (1976) and Superman II (1980). Years earlier he portrayed a serious character in The Reivers (1969), opposite Steve McQueen, playing a mean, corrupt country sheriff. Two years earlier he had portrayed a hard-nosed Southern prison floor-walker in Cool Hand Luke (1967). In Juggernaut (1974) he portrayed one of the first passengers aboard a luxury liner to realize there was a serious problem with the ship.

James portrayed the district attorney who prosecuted Al Capone in the film The Untouchables (1987). He played a Navy master-at-arms in The Last Detail (1973), starring Jack Nicholson, and Chicago White Sox baseball team owner Charles Comiskey in the true story Eight Men Out (1988), a drama about the corrupt 1919 Chicago White Sox.

Despite being born in the Northwest and spending much of his life in New York (where he was an Actors Studio member of long standing), James was cast as a Southerner in many of his screen roles, such as his appearances in the James Bond films, and as powerful Houston lawyer Striker Bellman in the daytime soap opera Texas from 1981 to 1982.

In 1966, he guest-starred as Tenner Jackson, a successful poker player later killed for his winnings in the episode “The Wrong Man” (alongside Carroll O’Connor) on the TV Western Gunsmoke (S12E7).

James again portrayed a Southern character when he played Sheriff Lester Crabb, a temporary one-off replacement for regular Sheriff Rosco P. Coltrane (James Best) in the second-season Dukes of Hazzard episode "Treasure of Hazzard" (1980). He appeared on 13 episodes of the sitcom Lewis & Clark in 1981–1982. Other television credits include the 1976 private-eye drama City of Angels and the miniseries Captains and the Kings (1976). He appeared in two episodes of The A-Team: as murderous prison warden Beale in the first-season episode "Pros and Cons" (1983) and as corrupt Sheriff Jake Dawson in the second season's "The White Ballot" (1983). In 1996, he played the role of Red Kilgreen on All My Children. James appeared in the 1979 pilot episode of Hart to Hart playing the part of a highway cop. James also played the train passenger Wilkes on the Gunsmoke episode "Snow Train" (1970).

His other film roles include those of a wealthy Montana land baron whose cattle are being rustled in Rancho Deluxe (1975) and as the source who tips off a newspaperman to a potentially explosive story in The Bonfire of the Vanities (1990). James was featured a number of times by writer-director John Sayles, including Eight Men Out (1988), Lone Star (1996) and Sunshine State (2002).

James' last known film appearance was in Raising Flagg (2006), although he had been cast in a starring role to appear in the feature film Old Soldiers, playing a true-to-life elderly veteran of World War II. Production on that film was halted in 2016.

Personal life
James married twice: to Donna Lea Beach from 1948 to 1950, with whom he had one child, and to Laurie Harper, from 1951 until her death in 2015, with whom he had five children. He resided in Gladstone, Oregon, and died from complications of diabetes on April 15, 2017, aged 96.

Selected filmography 

The Strange One (1957) as Colonel Ramsey
The Last Mile (1959) as Harris
Something Wild (1961) as Detective Bogart
Experiment in Terror (1962) as Capt. Moreno
David and Lisa (1962) as John
Black Like Me (1964) as Eli Carr
Invitation to a Gunfighter (1964) as Tuttle
The Chase (1966) as Lem Brewster
The Happening (1967) as O'Reilly
The Caper of the Golden Bulls (1967) as Philippe
Cool Hand Luke (1967) as Carr
Will Penny (1967) as Catron
The Reivers (1969) as Butch Lovemaiden
...tick...tick...tick... (1970) as D.J. Rankin
WUSA (1970) as Speed - Sailor in Bar
The Biscuit Eater (1972) as Mr. Eben
The New Centurions (1972) as Whitey
Kid Blue (1973) as Mr. Hendricks
Live and Let Die (1973) as Sheriff J.W. Pepper
The Werewolf of Washington (1973) as Attorney General
The Iceman Cometh (1973) as Pat McGloin
The Last Detail (1973) as M.A.A.
The Laughing Policeman (1973) as Officer Jim Maloney SFPD Bomb Squad
Bank Shot (1974) as Streiger
Buster and Billie (1974) as Jake
Juggernaut (1974) as Corrigan
The Man With The Golden Gun (1974) as Sheriff J.W. Pepper
Rancho Deluxe (1975) as John Brown
Friendly Persuasion (1975) as Sam Jordan
The Deadly Tower (1975) as Captain Fred Ambrose
From Hong Kong with Love (1975) as Bill
Silver Streak (1976) as Sheriff Chauncey
The Bad News Bears in Breaking Training (1977) as Sy Orlansky
Caboblanco (1980) as Lorrimer
Superman II (1980) as Sheriff
The Dukes of Hazzard (1980) as Sheriff Lester Crabb
Talk to Me (1984) as State Trooper
Kidco (1984) as Orville Peterjohn
Stiffs (1985) as Uncle Leo
Where Are the Children? (1986) as Chief Coffin
The Untouchables (1987) as District Attorney (uncredited)
Whoops Apocalypse (1988) as Maxton S. Pluck
Eight Men Out (1988) as Charles 'Commie' Comiskey
Walter & Carlo i Amerika (1989) as Tex
She-Devil (1989) as Bob's Father (uncredited)
The Bonfire of the Vanities (1990) as Albert Fox
Lone Star (1996) as Hollis Pogue
Interstate 84 (2000) as Buddy
Sunshine State (2002) as Buster Bidwell
Raising Flagg (2006) as Ed McIvor

References

External links
 
 
 
 
 Clifton James at the University of Wisconsin–Madison's Actors Studio audio collection
 Clips from Texas episodes
  Clifton James (Aveleyman)
 

1920 births
2017 deaths
American male film actors
American male television actors
Male actors from New York City
United States Army personnel of World War II
United States Army non-commissioned officers
Recipients of the Silver Star
Male actors from Spokane, Washington
Deaths from diabetes
People from Clackamas County, Oregon